Karen Dudley (born 5 January 1968) is a South African chef, food writer, and restaurateur. She is best known for her restaurant, The Kitchen in Woodstock, Cape Town, which was visited by former First Lady Michelle Obama in June 2011.

Karen has appeared on CNN and TEDx and has been interviewed by The New York Times and The Guardian. She has been a guest judge on the reality cooking show My Kitchen Rules South Africa and is often interviewed on national TV.

The Kitchen 

Dudley established The Kitchen in April 2009 after her catering business had outgrown her own home. The restaurant specializes in vegetable-led cuisine, salads and their signature Love Sandwich. The restaurant was permanently closed in May 2020 after the effects of the COVID-19 lockdown and its effect on South Africa.

Reception 

South African food blogger Andy Fenner has described Dudley as "a genius with vegetables and teasing flavour out of simple things". Yolisa Qunta of Daily Maverick noted that her work is "driven by community" and that the recipes which she shares with the public "emphasise the texture and flavour of fresh produce and finding the perfect condiments and relishes to compliment."

Books 

Karen Dudley has three books to her name,

 A Week in The Kitchen (2012, Jacana Media)
 Another Week in The Kitchen (2013, Jacana Media)
 Set a Table (2018, Jacana Media)

References 

1968 births
South African chefs
South African cookbook writers
South African people of British descent
South African television personalities
South African writers
People from Cape Town
Living people
Women cookbook writers